The 2007 Swale Borough Council election took place on 3 May 2007 to elect members of Swale Borough Council in Kent, England. One third of the council was up for election and the Conservative Party stayed in overall control of the council.

After the election, the composition of the council was:
Conservative 26
Labour 10
Liberal Democrats 6
Sheppey First 4
Independent 1

Election result
The new Sheppey First party won four of the six seats they contested, taking Leysdown and Warden, Minster Cliffs, Sheppey Central and Sheerness East wards. However the Conservatives remained in control of the council with 26 of the 47 councillors, despite also losing a seat in Queenborough and Halfway to Labour. This gain meant Labour remained on 10 seats, while the Liberal Democrats lost 2 seats to have 6 councillors and 1 independent candidate was elected.

Ward results

References

2007
2007 English local elections
2000s in Kent